Actinodaphne speciosa, known as elephant ears, is a species of plant in the family Lauraceae. It is endemic to Sri Lanka.

References

 
 http://lauraceae.myspecies.info/category/lauraceae/lauraceae/actinodaphne/actinodaphne-speciosa

speciosa
Endemic flora of Sri Lanka